Pérez Pérez also known as La Pérez Pérez is a hamlet in the Camagüey Province of Cuba within the consejo popular (i.e. "ward") of Rolando Valdivia and the municipality of Florida, with an estimated population is 76.

Overview
The village lies on the western portion of the province, located between Florida and Camaguey along the national highway "Carretera Central" (CC).

Economy
The economy is primarily agricultural.

Education
The rural school "Escuela Rural Eduardo Panizo Bustos" is the only school in the area.

References

Florida, Cuba
Populated places in Camagüey Province